The Martha's Vineyard Sharks is a collegiate summer baseball team based on Martha's Vineyard. It was a charter member of the Futures Collegiate Baseball League (FCBL), a wood-bat league comprising 7 teams from New Hampshire to western Connecticut. They played in the futures league from 2010 to 2018 before switching to the New England Collegiate Baseball League, where they began playing in the league in 2019. In 2019 the Sharks posted the best regular season record in the league and won best of 3 series with Newport Gulls to win Southern Division. Ultimately losing 2-0 in the Championship versus Keene Swampbats. The team’s mascot is a likely reference to the film Jaws, which was shot on Martha's Vineyard and made it a popular tourist destination.

The team's home games are played at Vineyard Baseball Park, located on the Martha's Vineyard Regional High School campus in Oak Bluffs, Massachusetts, where $200,000 has been invested in field upgrades and construction of a field house, public Restrooms and a pro style backstop with netting and brick facade.

History
The Sharks began operations in the 2011 FCBL season. The Carminucci Sports Group sought to place a New England Collegiate Baseball League (NECBL) franchise on Martha's Vineyard, but the NECBL declined to expand, so the Sharks and the organizers of the Nashua Silver Knights formed a separate league. Opening Day attendance was 2,139. The Sharks were in 1st place for a majority of the season, before injuries and a team-wide virus. They completed the season at 23-20, in 3rd place. The Sharks won their first FCBL Championship in 2013 and shared the title in 2018.

The Sharks moved to the NECBL in 2019 and posted the best regular season record, including a 12-game win streak. In the postseason, the Sharks won a best of 3 series over the Newport Gulls. Ultimately, the Sharks lost 2 straight to league Champion Keene Swampbats. The Sharks broke a single game attendance record with 3,567 fans in attendance on the last regular season home game of the season.2022 went 5-0 in playoffs to win their first NECBL league Championship. Hosted the 2022 all star game with attendance exceeding 5k fans.

Field Staff

Head CoachBilly Uberti

Assistant Coaches

Mac Curran
Collin Shapiro

References

External links
 Martha's Vineyard Sharks official site
 NECBL official site

Amateur baseball teams in Massachusetts
New England Collegiate Baseball League teams
Futures Collegiate Baseball League teams
Martha's Vineyard
Baseball teams established in 2010
2010 establishments in Massachusetts